Senator Hines may refer to:

Donald E. Hines (1933–2019), Louisiana State Senate
John Hines (Wyoming politician) (born 1936), Wyoming State Senate
William Henry Hines (1856–1914), Pennsylvania State Senate